LHU may refer to:

 Lạc Hồng University, Dong Nai, Vietnam
 Langer Heinrich Uranium Mine, Namibia; see Mining in Namibia
 Liverpool Hope University, Liverpool, England, UK
 Lock Haven University of Pennsylvania, Lock Haven, Pennsylvania, USA
 Lunghwa University of Science and Technology, a university in Taiwan

 Lahu language (ISO 639 code lhu)
 Loharu Junction railway station (station code: LHU), Loharu, India

See also

 IHU (disambiguation)